St Catherine's Church is the oldest church in Gdańsk, Poland. It was a Protestant church from 1545 until the end of World War II in 1945, after which it returned to the Catholic Church.

It houses the world's first pulsar clock (since 2011), the Museum of Turret Clocks (part of the Museum of Gdańsk) and previously (2000-2006) an art gallery (in its attic).

In 2006 it suffered a major roof fire.

Gallery

External links 

Roman Catholic churches in Gdańsk
Tourist attractions in Gdańsk
Churches in Poland
The Most Holy Virgin Mary, Queen of Poland